Mehmed Pasha Kukavica Mosque was one of five mosques in Foča town, in Bosnia and Herzegovina which typologically belonged to a single-space domed mosque with an open exterior portico. It was located in Gornja (Upper) čaršija (Foča's old town), and completely destroyed during the Bosnian War. Built in 1751, it was a part of an architectural ensemble consisting of the mosque, madrasa (completed in 1758), clock tower and hammam (Turkish bath), all endowments of Foča-born Mehmed-paša Kukavica, one of the most prominent Ottoman governors of Bosnia.

The mosque and the rest of the architectural ensemble, as well as most of the old town of Foča (Ottoman architecture of Prijeka čaršija) was demolished in 1992 on the orders of the authorities of Republika Srpska, immediately after the attack and ethnic cleansing of its Muslim inhabitants.

The architectural ensemble of the mosque, medresa, clock tower and hammam (Turkish bath) of Mehmed-paša Kukavica in Foča are designated as a National Monument of Bosnia and Herzegovina by Bosnia and Herzegovina Commission to Preserve National Monuments.

See also
Bosnian architecture
List of mosques
Islamic architecture
Islamic art

References

External links

Bosnia and Herzegovina Commission to Preserve National Monuments: Mehmed Pasha Kukavica Mosque in Foča

Buildings and structures in Foča
Architecture in Bosnia and Herzegovina
Mosques in Bosnia and Herzegovina
Mosques destroyed by Christians
Attacks on religious buildings and structures during the Bosnian War
18th-century mosques
Ottoman mosques in Bosnia and Herzegovina
National Monuments of Bosnia and Herzegovina
Religious buildings and structures completed in 1752
Demolished buildings and structures in Bosnia and Herzegovina
Buildings and structures demolished in 1992